Lynx is a Finnish snowmobile brand in Finland, manufactured and distributed by Bombardier Recreational Products (BRP), which has made many unique inventions in snowmobile technology. Lynx is a part of a Canadian company BRP. The newest Lynx snowmobiles are built on Ski-Doo platform with minor differences, but they use a different rear suspension called PPS (Pauli Piippola Suspension) made for rougher conditions than a traditional Ski-Doo suspension system, which is not as tough or heavy as the PPS system.

Lynx snowmobiles feature the Bombardier Recreational Products Rotax engine. This engine design is also used in Ski-Doo brand snowmobiles.

The Lynx lineup features four different categories of snowmobiles which range in performance and function: Sport, Crossover, Touring, and Utility.

In 2018, Lynx introduced the Radien chassis. The Radien chassis is also based on the Ski-Doo chassis, but it's made shorter, lighter and smaller.
The weight center is also improved on the Radien chassis.

References

External links
 

Bombardier Recreational Products
Snowmobile brands
Vehicle manufacturing companies established in 1968
Tracked vehicles
Valmet